Contomastix vacariensis is a species of teiid lizard endemic to Brazil.

References

vacariensis
Reptiles of Brazil
Endemic fauna of Brazil
Reptiles described in 2000
Taxa named by Aline Costa Feltrim
Taxa named by Thales de Lema